Madhavpur (Ghed) is a small but culturally significant village in state of Gujarat, India. It lies on the seashore, close to Porbandar.

According to folklore, Krishna married Rukmini at Madhavpur. This event is memorialised with a temple dedicated to lord Madhavrai and by an annual fair held in the village.

Madhavrai Temple

Madhavpur is the site of a 15th-century temple of Madhavraiji who is a form of Lord Krishna. The original temple has been badly damaged by attacks by Muslim invaders, however a ruined structure is still present and gives idea of original undamaged temple. A newly constructed temple is used for worship now adjacent to the old one.

Annual Fair
Every year, for five days from day of Ram Navmi, a cultural fair is organized mainly on the background of religious belief of Krishna marrying Rukmini. A colorful chariot is decorated and form of Krishna is placed in the chariot and a procession proceeds through the village as a part of celebrating the event of Krishna's marriage. Village people put colors on each other as part of a celebration that also involves joyful dancing.

Vallabhacharya's Bethak

Madhavpur is also culturally significant due to one of the seats of Vallabhacharya who is founder of Pushtimarg Vaishnava Hindu sect. The seat, called as Baithak or more respectably Bethakji is 66th of the 84 Baithaks of Vallabhacharya.

References

Villages in Porbandar district